Anthony Quantrell Brown (born November 6, 1972) is a former American football offensive lineman who played five seasons in the National Football League (NFL) with the Cincinnati Bengals and Pittsburgh Steelers. He played college football at the University of Utah and attended Würzburg American High School in Würzburg, Germany.

References

External links
Just Sports Stats

1972 births
Living people
African-American players of American football
American football offensive linemen
Cincinnati Bengals players
Pittsburgh Steelers players
Sportspeople from Okinawa Prefecture
Utah Utes football players
21st-century African-American sportspeople
20th-century African-American sportspeople